The AU Grabber (pronounced as: Gold Grabber;) is a self-propelled barge excavator dredge used to mine Bering Sea placer gold deposits in the region around Nome, Alaska, USA. It is owned and operated by Richard Schimschat and featured in the Discovery Channel USA mining reality TV show Bering Sea Gold. It cost $600,000 to buy. In 2017 a 120-lb two-week-old seal was found on the dredge. Hank Schimschat retired from mining in 2019, and hired out the AU Grabber. Though no longer part of the show, in 2020, the dredge once again appeared on Bering Sea Gold, still mining in the Nome region. At the end of the 2020 season, while pulling out the dredge, it was improperly supported, bending the boat, ending its journey. The equipment of AU Grabber was moved to a new barge, the Mistress (stylized as Mistre$$), for the 2021 gold season.

Specifications

Vessel 1031061
 Launch date: 1995
 Length:  
 Width: 
 Depth: 
 Net tonnage: 
 Gross tonnage:

Notes

References

External links
 Boat Database (boatdb.net) Nome, AK port boats

See also
 Myrtle Irene
 Tuvli 160
 Christine Rose (dredge)
 Viking Dredge 1
 Viking Dredge 2
 Bima (dredge)

Bering Sea Gold
Dredgers
Ships of the United States
2020 disestablishments in Alaska